Bonaparte is the fourth studio album by Berlin-based indie punk musician Bonaparte (Tobias Jundt). It was released on February 14, 2014.

Track listing
"1-800" – 2:30
"I Wanna Sue Someone" – 3:05
"Me So Selfie (feat. Tim Fite)" – 3:20
"Two Girls" – 2:59
"Into The Wild" – 3:56
"Riot In My Head" – 3:57
"Wash Your Thighs" – 3:00
"Out Of Control" – 3:54
"Yes Dear You're Right I'm Sorry" – 2:43
"May The Best Sperm Win" – 3:07
"Like An Umlaut In English" – 3:27
"If We Lived Here" – 3:13

recorded in the basement on 317 East, 5th Street (East Village) and Rola Pola Studios, Williamsburg (Brooklyn)
mixed at Rola Pola Studios, Williamsburg (Brooklyn)
All songs written by Tobias Jundt, except "Me So Selfie" written by T. Jundt & T. Sullivan.

Personnel
Bonaparte
Tobias Jundt – lead & backing vocals, guitars, bass, synthesizer, harmonica, keyboards, programming, drum-programming

Guest musicians
Tim Fite – lead vocal, backing vocals, synthesizer, programming (on “Me So Selfie”)

Session musicians
Christopher “Pow Pow” Powell (of Man Man) – live drums (on all songs, except “Riot In My Head”), timpani (on “1-800”)
Andre Vida – baritone saxophone (on “Wash Your Thighs”, “Yes Dear You’re Right I’m Sorry”, “May The Best Sperm Win”)
Uri Gincel – additional piano (on “1-800”), organ (on “Out Of Control”)
Monia Rizkallah – violin (on “Out Of Control”)
Hidden track features 2010 International Auctioneer Champion Eli Detweiler Jr.

Production team
Tobias Jundt – producer, recording engineer
Andy Baldwin – co-producer, recording engineer, mixing engineer
Tim Fite – co-production on “Me So Selfie"
Joe La Porta at Sterling Sound - mastering

References

2014 albums
Bonaparte (band) albums